Assalam Futebol Clube, commonly known as Assalam FC is an East Timorese professional football club based in Dili timor leste. The team plays in the Liga Futebol Amadora in the Primeira Divisão.They were the champions of the Segunda Divisão 2018, earning promotion to Primeira Divisão for the first time for the 2019 season. They are also the 2 time runners up of the Taça 12 de Novembro, losing in the final to Ponta Leste in 2016 and Atlético Ultramar 2018.

Squad

Competition records

Liga Futebol Amadora

Segunda Divisão 

 2016: 2nd place in Group B
 2017: 2nd place in Group B

2018: Champions

Primeira Divisão 

 2019: 6th place

Taça 12 de Novembro
2016: Runner-up
2018: Runner-up
2019: Semi Finals

Copa FFTL 

 2020: 4th place

References

External links
Official facebook page

Football clubs in East Timor
Football
Association football clubs established in 2008
2008 establishments in East Timor